The GayVN Awards are film awards presented annually to honor work done in the gay pornographic industry. The awards were sponsored by AVN Magazine, the parent publication of GAYVN Magazine, and continue the recognition for gay pornography which was part of the AVN Awards from 1986–1998. The awards went on a hiatus after the 2011 ceremony and returned in 2018.

The award recipients are listed below by the year of the award ceremony. In 1998, the first year of the awards, awards were given for that current year's work. Starting with the awards show held in 2000, the awards were given for the previous year's work. For example, the 8th GAYVN Awards were held Thursday, March 9, 2006; awards were given for the movies that were released in 2005. The awards have been held annually since 2000.  The current record-holder for the most wins in one year is Lucas Entertainment's Michael Lucas' La Dolce Vita (2006), which won 14 awards in 2007.  The previous record-holder with 11 award wins in 2005 was Buckshot Productions' BuckleRoos.

1998
Winners from the 1998 GayVN Awards held December 4, 1998, at the Westin Bonaventure, Los Angeles, California, as published in Choices: The 1999 AVN Awards Show official program:
 [Top]

1999
Starting in 2000, awards would be given for the previous year's achievement. Therefore, the awards recognizing achievement in 1999 would be given at the award ceremony in 2000; there was no award ceremony in 1999.

2000
 [Top]

2001
 [Top]

2002
 [Top]

2003
Host: Taylor Negron

 [Top]

2004
 [Top]

2005
 [Top]

2006
 [Top]

2007
Host: Kathy Griffin

 [Top]

2008
Host: Derek Hartley & Romaine Patterson
Cohost: Lady Bunny

 [Top]

2009
Host: Janice Dickinson & Margaret Cho
Cohost: Alec Mapa

 [Top]

2010
Host: Alec Mapa

 [Top]

2018
GayVN Awards was held after a hiatus of seven years on January 21, 2018, at Hard Rock Hotel Casino in Las Vegas. It was hosted by Shangela Laquifa Wadley and was held a week before 35th AVN Award at the same location. Awards were presented in 27 categories.

Full list of nominees and winners 
 [Top]

2019
Awards were presented at The Joint at Hard Rock Hotel and Casino in Las Vegas on January 21, 2019.
2019 GayVN Hall of Fame Inductee
Keith Miller, founder of Helix Studios
Best Actor (Tie)
Wesley Woods, Zack & Jack Make a Porno, Falcon Studios
Diego Sans, Pirates: A Gay XXX Parody, Men.com/Pulse
Best All-Sex Movie
Summer Break 2, BelAmi/Pulse
Best Bi Sex Scene
Lance Hart, Pierce Paris & Dahlia Sky; Wanna Fuck My Wife? Gotta Fuck Me Too 11, Devil's Film
Best Director – Feature
Jake Jaxson, All Saints: Chapter 1, CockyBoys
Best Director – Non-Feature
Chi Chi LaRue & Tony Dimarco; Love & Lust in New Orleans, Falcon Studios
Best Duo Sex Scene
Max Konnor & Armond Rizzo; “Big Black Daddy,” NoirMale.com
Best Feature
All Saints: Chapter 1, CockyBoys
Best Fetish Sex Scene
JJ Knight & Sean Zevran; Tie Me Up! Dick Me Down!, CockyBoys
Best Group Sex Scene
Josh Brady, Corbin Colby, Joey Mills, Cameron Parks, Angel Rivera & Luke Wilder; “Splash,” HelixStudios.com
Best Newcomer
Alam Wernik
Best Parody
Pirates: A Gay XXX Parody, Men.com/Pulse
Best Supporting Actor
Bruce Beckham, The Slutty Professor, NakedSword/Falcon
Best Three-Way Sex Scene
Ace Era, Tyler Roberts & Dave Slick; The Slutty Professor, NakedSword/Falcon
Performer of the Year
Wesley Woods

2020
Awards were presented at The Joint at Hard Rock Hotel and Casino in Las Vegas on January 21, 2020. The show was hosted by Alec Mapa and Nicole Byer, with performances by King Princess and Alyssa Edwards.

2020 GayVN Hall of Fame inductee
Tim Valenti, NakedSword/Falcon Studios CEO
Best Actor
DeAngelo Jackson, Blended Family, Icon Male/Mile High
Best All-Sex Movie
Love and Lust in Montreal, Falcon Studios
Best Bi Sex Scene
Natalie Mars, Ella Nova, Ricky Larkin & Wesley Woods; Free for All, WhyNotBi.com
Best Director – Feature
Jake Jaxson & RJ Sebastian; Le Garçon Scandaleux, CockyBoys/PinkTV;
Best Director – Non-Feature
Steve Cruz; Outta the Park!, Raging Stallion/Falcon
Best Duo Sex Scene
Ashton Summers & Phoenix Fellington, Fellington’s Flip Fuck, HelixStudios.com
Best Feature
Vegas Nights, HelixStudios.com
Best Fetish Sex Scene
Alex Mecum & Michael DelRay; My Brother's Discipline, Kink.com
Best Group Sex Scene
Alam Wernik, Blake Ryder, Jay Dymel, Nic Sahara & Sean Duran; Five Brothers: The Takedown, NakedSword/Falcon
Best Newcomer
Nic Sahara and Alex Riley (tie)
Best Supporting Actor
Dante Colle, At Large, Raging Stallion/Falcon
Best Three-Way Sex Scene
Jack Harrer, Peter Annaud & Marcel Gassion; Offensively Large 4, BelAmi/Pulse
Performer of the Year
Cade Maddox

Fan awards
Favorite Bear
Teddy Torres
Favorite Body
Blake Mitchell
Favorite Bottom
Rourke
Favorite Butt
Beaux Banks
Favorite Cam Guy
Callum and Cole (joint page)
Favorite Cock
Calvin Banks
Favorite Daddy
Rocco Steele
Favorite Dom
Austin Wolf
Favorite FTM Star
Billy Vega
Favorite Top
Zilv Gudel
Favorite Twink
Joey Mills
Hottest Newcomer
Rhyheim Shabazz
Social Media Star
Armond Rizzo

2021
Awards were presented virtually during a live stream at AVNStars.com on January 18, 2021. The show was hosted by Alec Mapa and Sherry Vine.

Best Actor
Angel Rivera, A Murdered Heart, NakedSword
Best All-Sex Movie
Summer Loves, BelAmi
Best Bi Sex Scene
Maya Bijou, Dante Colle & Kaleb Stryker, The Elevator Goes Both Ways, WhyNotBi.com
Best Director – Feature
Jake Jaxson & RJ Sebastian, Hollywood & Vine, CockyBoys
Best Director – Non-Feature
Steve Cruz, Cake Shop, Raging Stallion
Best Duo Sex Scene
Rhyheim Shabazz & Sean Zevran, Big Dicks Going Deep, CockyBoys
Best Feature
A Murdered Heart, NakedSword
Best Fetish Sex Scene
Dirk Caber, Nate Grimes, Jaxx Thanatos & Kurtis Wolfe, Tom of Finland: Leather Bar Initiation, Men.com
Best Group Sex Scene
Riley Finch, Johnny Hands, Jacob Hansen, Garrett Kinsley, Travis Stevens & Ashton Summers, Inside Helix, Helix Studios
Best Newcomer
Brock Banks

Fan Awards

Hottest Newcomer

Seth Peterson

Favorite Twink

Austin L Young

Social Media Star

Joey Mills

Favorite Cam Guy

Max Konnor

Favorite Camming Couple

Jacob and Harley

Favorite Top

Austin Wolf

Favorite bottom

Devin Franco

Favorite FTM Star

Trip Richards

Favorite Dom

Zilv Gudel

Favorite Cock

Cade Maddox

Favorite Butt

Alam Wernik

Favorite Bear

Teddy Torres

Favorite Daddy

Rocco Steele

Favorite Body

Alex Mecum

GayVN Star of the Year

Camran Mac

2022
Awards were presented virtually on January 19, 2022. The show was hosted by Alec Mapa and Jackie Beat.

2022 GayVN Hall of Fame inductee
Howard Andrew, FabScout Entertainment
Performer of the Year
Max Konnor
Best All-Sex Movie
Fuck Me I'm Famous (BelAmi/TLAGay)
Best Bi Sex Scene
Draven Navarro, Joel Someone and Vanessa Vega, My Wife Found Out I'm Bi! (Devil’s Film)
Best Director — Feature
Alex Roman, Return to Helix Academy Parts 1 and 2 (Helix Studios)
Best Director — Non-Feature
Steve Cruz and Leo Forte, Born to Porn (Falcon Studios)

Fan awards
Favorite Camming Couple
Pablo and Sebas
Favorite Cock
Cade Maddox
Hottest Newcomer
Felix Fox

See also

 Adult Erotic Gay Video Awards
 List of Grabby recipients
 List of gay pornography awards
 Gay Erotic Video Awards
 List of male performers in gay porn films

References

 GayVN Awards
 Previous GayVN Winners

External links

 Official Website
 2010 "GayVN Weekend: List of Winners" 

Pornographic film awards
Gay pornographic film awards
American pornographic film awards
Awards established in 1998
21st-century awards